Orekhovo-Zuyevsky District is an administrative and municipal district (raion), one of the thirty-six in Moscow Oblast, Russia. It is located in the east of the oblast. Its administrative center is the city of Orekhovo-Zuyevo (which is not administratively a part of the district). Population: 121,916 (2010 Census);

Geography
Climate, flora, and fauna are common for Meshchera Lowlands. Main rivers include the Klyazma River with its tributaries the Vyrka, the Senga, and the Bolshaya Dubna. The district has significant peat reserves.

Administrative and municipal status
Within the framework of administrative divisions, Orekhovo-Zuyevsky District is one of the thirty-six in the oblast. The city of Orekhovo-Zuyevo serves as its administrative center, despite being incorporated separately as a city under oblast jurisdiction—an administrative unit with the status equal to that of the districts.

As a municipal division, the district is incorporated as Orekhovo-Zuyevsky Municipal District. Orekhovo-Zuyevo City Under Oblast Jurisdiction is incorporated separately from the district as Orekhovo-Zuyevo Urban Okrug.

Notable people
 Vasily Arkhipov

References

Notes

Sources

Districts of Moscow Oblast